USS Canfield (DE-262) was an  constructed for the United States Navy during World War II. She was sent off into the Pacific Ocean to protect convoys and other ships from Japanese submarines and fighter aircraft. She performed escort and antisubmarine operations in dangerous battle areas and returned home with four battle stars.

Namesake
Leon William Canfield was born on 9 November 1915 in New York City. On 13 May 1940 he enlisted in the United States Naval Reserve and after aviation training, was discharged on 4 March 1941. He reenlisted on 25 July 1941 and attended the U.S. Navy Midshipmen's School, Fort Schuyler, New York. He was appointed Ensign on 16 January 1942.

In November 1942, he was serving on board the battleship  in the Naval Battle of Guadalcanal. At about 00:57 on 15 November a 6-inch Imperial Japanese Navy shell penetrated into the radar plot on the port side of the South Dakota and demolished it killing him.

Construction and commissioning
She was launched on 6 April 1943 by Boston Navy Yard; sponsored by Mrs. L. W. Canfield; and commissioned on 22 July 1943.

Service history
Canfield sailed from Boston, Massachusetts on 13 October 1943 for Pearl Harbor, arriving on 17 November. From 25 November – 10 December, she screened the vital but vulnerable tankers supporting air strikes on the Marshall Islands. In January, Canfield sailed to Majuro, from which base she continued to operate on convoy escort, patrol, and plane guard in the Marshalls operation.

Returning to Pearl Harbor in April 1944, Canfield got underway on 6 May escorting a tanker convoy bound for Majuro. Here she resumed escort duties, now supporting the Marianas operation. In September, the escort vessel arrived at Eniwetok, and until December, guarded convoys to the forward base at Ulithi. These convoys carried the men and supplies essential to the Philippines operation.

Early in March 1945, after a visit to Pearl Harbor, Canfield arrived off Iwo Jima, and served on patrol during the assault and capture of the northern part of the island. On 20 March, she embarked men of the veteran 4th Marines for transportation to Pearl Harbor.

Canfield continued to San Francisco, California, for overhaul, and San Diego, California, for refresher training, returning to Pearl Harbor on 7 June. After a month of antisubmarine and plane guard duty, she sailed for San Pedro Bay, Philippine Islands, where she joined a Japan-bound occupation convoy. Canfield anchored in Tokyo Bay on 20 September.

On 6 October, Canfield was underway for San Francisco. Here, she was decommissioned on 21 December 1945, and sold for scrap on 12 June 1947.

Awards
Canfield received four battle stars for World War II service.

References

External links

NavSource Online: Destroyer Escort Photo Archive - USS Canfield (DE-262)

World War II frigates and destroyer escorts of the United States
Evarts-class destroyer escorts
Ships built in Boston
1943 ships